Robert Alexander "Sandy" Blythe, OAM (24 February 1962 – 18 November 2005) was an Australian wheelchair basketball player. He became a paraplegic due to a car accident in 1981, and went on to participate in the Australia men's national wheelchair basketball team at four Paralympic Games, captaining the gold medal-winning team at the 1996 Atlanta Paralympics. He committed suicide in 2005 at the age of 43 after a long illness.

Biography
Blythe was born in Geelong on 24 February 1962. He grew up in a farm outside the Victorian town of Derrinallum and was a champion Australian rules football player as a teenager. He played in the Teal Cup and was later part of the St Kilda Football Club country squad. In 1981, he began studying at the Ballarat College of Advanced Education, but later that year, he was involved in a three-car collision that rendered him paraplegic. In 1984 he obtained his physical education degree on schedule, despite his six-month rehabilitation at Austin Hospital.

He was part of the Australia men's national wheelchair basketball team at the 1988 Seoul, 1992 Barcelona, 1996 Atlanta, and 2000 Sydney Paralympics. He was the captain of the team when it won a gold medal at the 1996 Atlanta Games and was co-captain with Priya Cooper of the Australian Paralympic team at the 2000 Sydney Games. He had an Australian Institute of Sport scholarship in 1998 for wheelchair basketball.

Blythe was also a motivational speaker who formed and worked in several businesses that improved public awareness of people with disabilities. In 2000, he released a memoir, Blythe Spirit.

On 18 November 2005, Blythe committed suicide; he had had depression and chronic fatigue syndrome for several years. He was survived by his partner of eight years, wheelchair basketballer Paula Coghlan.

Recognition
Blythe received a Medal of the Order of Australia in 1997 for his 1996 gold medal. In 2000, he received an Australian Sports Medal. The Sandy Blythe Medal, awarded to the best player of the year in the Australia men's national wheelchair basketball team, is named in his honour. In 2010, he was posthumously inducted into the Australian Basketball Hall of Fame.

References

External links
 

1962 births
2005 suicides
Australian Institute of Sport Athletes with a Disability alumni
Paralympic wheelchair basketball players of Australia
Paralympic gold medalists for Australia
Paralympic medalists in wheelchair basketball
Wheelchair category Paralympic competitors
Wheelchair basketball players at the 1988 Summer Paralympics
Wheelchair basketball players at the 1992 Summer Paralympics
Wheelchair basketball players at the 1996 Summer Paralympics
Wheelchair basketball players at the 2000 Summer Paralympics
Medalists at the 1996 Summer Paralympics
Recipients of the Medal of the Order of Australia
Recipients of the Australian Sports Medal
People with paraplegia
Sportspeople from Geelong
Federation University Australia alumni
Suicides in Victoria (Australia)